Sa Puso ni Dok (International title: Village Doctor / ) is a 2014 Philippine television drama series broadcast by GMA Network. Directed by Adolf Alix Jr., it stars Dennis Trillo and Bela Padilla. It premiered on August 24, 2014 on network's Sunday Grande line up. The series concluded on September 28, 2014 with a total of 6 episodes.

Cast and characters

Lead cast
 Dennis Trillo as Dennis
 Bela Padilla as Gab

Supporting cast
 Menggie Cobarrubias as Dr. Dela Cruz 
 Milkcah Wynne Nacion as Baby
 Maey Bautista as Veronica 
 Gigi Locsin as Loring
 Stephanie Sol as Carla
 AJ Dee as Jomar

Ratings
According to AGB Nielsen Philippines' Mega Manila household television ratings, the pilot episode of Sa Puso ni Dok earned a 15% rating. While the final episode scored a 12.9% rating.

Accolades

References

External links
 

2014 Philippine television series debuts
2014 Philippine television series endings
Filipino-language television shows
GMA Network drama series
GMA Integrated News and Public Affairs shows
Philippine medical television series
Television shows set in Manila